The Pelham City School District is a public school district in Mitchell County, Georgia, based in Pelham. It serves the city of Pelham and the surrounding communities in Mitchell County.

Schools
The Pelham City School District has one elementary school, one middle school, and one high school.

Elementary school
Pelham Elementary School

Middle school
Pelham City Middle School

High school
Pelham High School

References

External links

School districts in Georgia (U.S. state)
Education in Mitchell County, Georgia